The European conger (Conger conger) is a species of conger of the family Congridae. It is the heaviest eel in the world and native to the northeast Atlantic, including the Mediterranean Sea.

Description and behavior
They can be rivaled or marginally exceeded in length by the largest species of moray eel but these tend to be slenderer and thus weigh less than the larger congers. Average specimens caught will weigh only .

The body is very long, anguilliform, without scales. The colour is usually grey, but can also be blackish. The belly is white. A row of small white spots is aligned along the lateral line. The head is almost conical, and slightly depressed. The snout is rounded and prominent, with lateral olfactory holes. The large gill openings are in the lateral position. The conical teeth are arranged in rows on the jaws. The dorsal and anal fins are confluent with caudal fin. Pectoral fins are present, while ventral fins are absent.

 
Conger eels have habits similar to moray eels. They usually live amongst rocks in holes, or "eel pits", sometimes in one hole together with moray eels. They come out from their holes at night to hunt. These nocturnal predators mainly feed on fish, cephalopods, and crustaceans, although they are thought to scavenge on dead and rotting fish, as well as actively hunt live fish. Congers can be aggressive to humans, and large specimens can pose a danger to divers.

Distribution
This species can be found in the eastern Atlantic from Norway and Iceland to Senegal, and also in the Mediterranean and Black Sea at 0–500 m of depth, although they may reach depths of 3600 m during their migrations. It is usually present on rough, rocky, broken ground, close to the coast when young, moving to deeper waters when adult.

Migration and reproduction
When conger eels are between 5 and 15 years old, their bodies undergo a transformation, with the reproductive organs of both males and females increasing in size and the skeleton reducing in mass and the teeth falling out. Females appear to increase in weight and size more than the males. Conger eels then make migrations to spawning areas in the Mediterranean and the Atlantic, "although the existence of one or multiple spawning grounds for the species remains uncertain". The female conger eels produce several million eggs, and both the females and males die after spawning. Once hatched, the larval conger eels begin to swim back to shallower waters, where they live until they reach maturity. They then migrate to repeat the cycle.

Gallery

References

External links
 
 
 

European conger
European conger
Fish of the Black Sea
Fish of Europe
Fish of the Mediterranean Sea
Fish of the North Sea
Marine fauna of North Africa
European conger